Michael Nemec (born 26 November 1955) is an Austrian former pair skater. With his sister, Ursula Nemec, he represented Austria at the 1976 Winter Olympics, where the pair placed 10th.

Competitive highlights

With Ursula Nemec

With Jenny Booth

References

Navigation

Austrian male pair skaters
Olympic figure skaters of Austria
Figure skaters at the 1976 Winter Olympics
1955 births
Living people